Droogmansia megalantha is a plant in the legume family Fabaceae, native to southern tropical Africa.

Description

Distribution and habitat
Droogmansia megalantha is native to Angola and Zambia. Its habitat is in woodland.

References

Desmodieae
Flora of Angola
Flora of Zambia
Plants described in 1896